Magnolia dawsoniana, known as Dawson's magnolia, is a magnolia species native to the provinces of Sichuan and Yunnan in China, usually at altitudes of .

Description

It is a small, ornamental deciduous tree that can grow to heights of 20 m. Leaf shape is obovate to elliptic-obovate, 7.5–14 cm-long, and is bright green above and glaucous underneath. The white to reddish flowers are large (16–25 cm wide), fragrant, and appear before leaves. It was first discovered in western Sichuan in 1869 by Père Jean Pierre Armand and was introduced in western cultivation in 1908, when E.H. Wilson sent seeds from plants growing near Kangding, Sichuan, to Arnold Arboretum in Jamaica Plain, Massachusetts. They are, however, rarely cultivated.

Magnolia dawsoniana is cold hardy to USDA hardiness zone 6.

References

External links
Photos of flowers and fruit

dawsoniana
Endemic flora of China
Trees of China
Garden plants of Asia
Ornamental trees